Frank Stewart is an American former Negro league pitcher who played in the 1930s.

Stewart made his Negro leagues debut in 1934 with the Homestead Grays. He went on to play for the Washington Elite Giants in 1936.

References

External links
 and Seamheads

Year of birth missing
Place of birth missing
Homestead Grays players
Washington Elite Giants players
Baseball pitchers